The JAC Rein (瑞鹰) is a compact sport utility vehicle (SUV) produced by Chinese automaker JAC Motors since 2007.

Overview
The JAC Rein was originally launched as the JAC Eagle. The new name Rein in Chinese is 瑞鹰, Ruiying, meaning ‘Lucky Eagle’. JAC translated Ruiying into English as ‘Rein’ but they also use the name ‘Eagle’ in some foreign markets. The JAC Eagle name was later used to rebadge a series of crossovers from the JAC Refine product series for some foreign markets.

The JAC Rein is based on the first generation Hyundai Santa Fe due to the joint venture between Hyundai and JAC Motors with JAC building Hyundai Santa Fes under license previously. The rear lights look like the ones from a 2008 Lexus RX. It was launched in 2007 with a starting price of 79,800 yuan.

The JAC Rein is powered by a 2.0 liter turbo with 178hp at 5400rpm and 235nm at 4500rpm. Other engine options include an older 2.4 liter engine, a 2.0 liter engine and a 1.9 liter turbo diesel.

References

External links

 (JAC)

Rein
Compact sport utility vehicles
Crossover sport utility vehicles
Front-wheel-drive vehicles
All-wheel-drive vehicles
Cars introduced in 2007
Cars of China